Whitney Wolfe Herd (born July 5, 1989) is an American entrepreneur.
She is the founder and CEO of publicly traded Bumble, Inc, an online dating platform, launched in 2014. She is a co-founder of Tinder and was previously its Vice President of Marketing. 

Wolfe Herd was named as one of 2017's and 2018's Forbes 30 Under 30, and, in 2018, she was named in the Time 100 List. In February 2021, Wolfe Herd became the world's youngest, female, self-made billionaire when she took Bumble public. She is the youngest woman to have taken a company public in the United States, at age 31.

Early life and education 
Wolfe Herd was born as Whitney Wolfe in Salt Lake City, Utah, to Kelly Wolfe, who was Catholic, and Michael Wolfe, a property developer, who was Jewish. Wolfe Herd attended Judge Memorial Catholic High School. When she was in sixth grade, the family went on a sabbatical in Paris, France.

Wolfe Herd attended Southern Methodist University, where she majored in international studies and was a member of the Kappa Kappa Gamma sorority. While in college and at the age of 20, she started a business selling bamboo tote bags to benefit areas affected by the BP oil spill. Wolfe Herd partnered with celebrity stylist Patrick Aufdenkamp to launch the non-profit organization called the "Help Us Project". The bags received national press after celebrities such as Rachel Zoe and Nicole Richie were photographed with them. Soon after, she introduced a second business with Aufdenkamp called "Tender Heart", a clothing line dedicated to raising awareness around human trafficking and fair trade. After graduating, Wolfe Herd traveled to Southeast Asia where she worked with orphanages.

Career

Early career
In 2012, at age 22, Wolfe Herd joined the startup Cardify, a project led by Sean Rad through Hatch Labs IAC incubator. The project was later abandoned, but Wolfe Herd joined the development team for the dating app Tinder (previously known as MatchBox) with Rad and Chris Gulczynski.

Wolfe Herd became vice president of marketing for Tinder. She was reportedly behind the name of the app, taking inspiration from the flame logo and the idea of tinder, which is easily combustible material used to start a fire. She has also been credited with fueling its popularity on college campuses and growing its user base.

Wolfe Herd resigned from Tinder in April 2014 due to growing tensions with other company executives. On June 30 she filed a lawsuit against Tinder for sexual harassment.

Having received online hate, Wolfe Herd started sketching out a female-only social network centered around compliments which was to be called Merci. Even though she didn't want to go back to the dating industry initially, in the following months she cooperated with Badoo founder Andrey Andreev on assembling a team and developing a new female-friendly dating app. She planned to name the app Moxie, but this name was already taken.

Bumble, Inc (2014 - present)
In December 2014, Wolfe Herd moved to Austin, Texas, and founded Bumble, a female-focused dating app. By December 2015, the app had reached over 15 million conversations and 80 million matches. After Wolfe Herd left Tinder, Andrey Andreev, founder of Badoo, contacted her about creating a dating platform and partnered with her, and the company remains majority owned by Badoo.

As of November 2017, Bumble had over 22 million registered users. In January 2018, CNBC reported that Badoo was seeking a sale that could value the company at about $1.5 billion.

Wolfe Herd was named one of Business Insider's 30 Most Important Women Under 30 In Tech in 2014. In 2016, she was named as one of Elle's Women in Tech. She was named to Forbes 30 under 30 in 2017 and 2018.

In December 2017, she was listed in a TechCrunch feature on 42 women succeeding in tech that year.

As of September 2019, Tinder and Bumble were the first and second most popular dating apps in the U.S., with monthly user bases of 7.9 million and 5 million, respectively.

In March 2019, Wolfe Herd testified before the Texas House Criminal Jurisprudence committee about the prevalence of unsolicited explicit photos sent to female users on dating applications.

In April 2019, Wolfe released the first print issue of Bumble Mag in partnership with Hearst.

In November 2019, Bumble's parent company MagicLab was sold to the private equity firm The Blackstone Group, with co-founder Andreev relinquishing his entire stake in both Bumble and its sister company, Badoo. Wolfe Herd became CEO of the newly acquired MagicLab, valued at $3 billion with an estimated 75 million users, and received an ownership stake of approximately 19% of the company.

In 2020, Bumble replaced MagicLab as the parent company of both Bumble and Badoo. As of 2020, Bumble has over 100 million users worldwide.

In February 2021, Bumble topped $13 billion in valuation after listing shares on the Nasdaq exchange. Her 18-month-old son was on her hip as she rang the Nasdaq bell.

In 2021, Wolfe Herd became the world's youngest self-made female billionaire after taking Bumble public. Forbes estimated her net worth at approximately $1.5 billion.

Chappy
UK-based gay dating app Chappy was co-founded by Jack Rogers, Max Cheremkin and Ollie Locke and funded primarily by Bumble and Wolfe Herd.

Personal life 
In December 2013, she met oil and gas heir Michael Herd on an Aspen skiing trip. They married in 2017. In December 2019, the couple announced the birth of their first child.

In 2022, Forbes listed Wolfe Herd at number 33 of the top 100 "America's richest self-made women," up from number 39 in 2020.

See also 

 Comparison of online dating services

References

External links 

 How I Built This: Bumble (audio interview)

1989 births
Living people
20th-century American Jews
Businesspeople from Salt Lake City
American computer businesspeople
Southern Methodist University alumni
American technology company founders
American women company founders
American company founders
American technology chief executives
Women corporate executives
American women chief executives
21st-century American Jews
20th-century American women
21st-century American women